Ryohei Ishikawa (born July 1927) is a Japanese banker, the former chairman of Chubu Bank and the Teisan Group. He is a philatelist specialising in the stamps and postal history of the United States, Hawaii, and Hong Kong.

Early life
Ryohei Ishikawa was born in July 1927.

Career
Ishikawa is a banker and the former chairman of Chubu Bank and the Teisan Group.

Philately

Ishikawa was briefly a stamp collector as a child. His interest was rekindled in 1970 when his mother gave him some old albums she had found in the family home. He decided to specialise in United States stamps after reading Stanley B. Ashbrook's The United States One Cent Stamp of 1851-1857 (1938) and subsequently formed a leading collection of that issue, moving on to other classic U.S. stamps.

In addition, Ishikawa has formed leading and award-winning collections of the stamps and postal history of Hawaii, Hong Kong, and foreign post offices in Japan. His U.S. collection included all the stamps issued from 1847 to 1869 as well as items such as the unique block of four of the 1869 24c stamps of the United States with an inverted center that had once been in the collection of William Thorne. The collection was sold for $9.5 million at Christie's, New York, in 1993.

Selected publications

Auctions

 The Ryohei Ishikawa Collection of The Postage Stamps and Postal History of the Hawaiian Islands. Sotheby Parke Bernet, New York, 1980.
 The Ryohei Ishikawa Collection: Postage Stamps and Postal History of Hong Kong and Treaty Ports. December 4th and 5th 1980. Sotheby Parke Bernet, London, 1980.
 The Ryohei Ishikawa Collection: Foreign Post Offices in Japan 7th July 1981. Sotheby Parke Bernet, London, 1981.
 The Ryohei Ishikawa Collection: United States Stamps and Covers 1847-1869 New York Tuesday, September 28 and Wednesday, September 29, 1993. Christie's, New York, 1993.

Books
 The Forerunner Foreign Post Offices in Japan. British-U.S.-French. Ryohei Ishikawa's Collection. Japan Philatelic Publications, Tokyo, 1976.

References

External links 

1927 births
Living people
Japanese bankers
Japanese philatelists
Philately of the United States
Philately of Hong Kong